Kakahu is a locality in the Canterbury region in the South Island of New Zealand. It is located about 22 kilometers (13.6 mi) west of Geraldine. It is well known for its rich historical and geological history.

History 
Kakahu Station run was taken up in 1853. The area was milled for timber in the early years before the focus changed to the rich mineral landscape in the area this included lime and marble.  The area was home to numerous lime kilns and quarries over the years including the still intact Hall Road Kiln.  A post office and two schools were constructed in the area. Kakahu School was opened in 1875 but was renamed in Hilton School in 1884 when the nearby Kakahu Bush School was opened. Kakahu Bush School was consolidated with Pleasant Point School in 1938. In 1910 St Aidan's Anglican Church was constructed which would remain open up until 1964 when diminishing numbers saw the building relocated to Marchwiel.

Notable landmarks

Kakahu Lime Kiln 

The Hall Road Kiln, the remaining kiln in the area was built in 1876 for or by Alexander Fergusson. The kiln can be seen from the road and is where the Kakahu Bush track commences. The kiln was used intermittently until the end of the twentieth century.

Kakahu Bush 
Kakahu Bush is a large area of native bush in the Kakahu area. Within the bush a walking track follows the remains of an old tramway which brought marble chips down from the quarries through the gorge. The track then passes through an opening where a number of English trees were planted in 1900 for a planned sanitarium for tuberculosis patients. The bush is well known for its native bush and wildlife, as well as its unique geological features.

Escarpment 
Across the road from the Kakahu Bush car park is an impressive limestone escarpment with cultural and geological significance.

References 

Timaru District
Populated places in Canterbury, New Zealand